Desulfitobacterium hafniense is a species of gram positive bacteria, its type strain is DCB-2T. ( NCBI taxonomy ID 272564; DSM 10664). 

D. hafniense are anaerobic spore-forming bacteria. The majority of the described isolates are facultatively organohalide respiring bacteria capable of reductive dechlorination of organohalides such as chlorophenols, and tetrachloroethene. The cells of D. hafniense are rod-shaped and 3.3 to 6 μm long by 0.6 to 0.7 μm wide, they are motile, each cell having one or two terminal flagella. All tested strains are resistant to the antibiotic vancomycin. 

Over the years several additional strains belonging to the hafniense species has been described from a diverse range of environments. Strains PCP-1, TCE1, DP7, TCP-A and G2 were originally published as members of a separate species Frappieri, but all are today considered as belonging to the hafniense species.

Genomes

The genome of D. hafniense contains the machinery for both pyrrolysine and selenocysteine, making it the only known organism that potentially utilizes 22 amino acids in protein translation. 
Desulfitobacterium hafniense strain DCB-2T has a single circular genome that contains 5.78 Mbp encoding 5,045  genes. The genome of Desulfitobacterium hafniense strain DCB-2T harbors seven genes encoding reductive dehalogenases, five of these seems to be functional and two are disrupted by mutations. 

Full genome sequence information is available for nine desulfitobacterium hafniense strains. They all have genome sizes ranging from 5 to 5,7 Mbp, none of the sequenced strains contains any plasmids. The genomes encodes only limited numbers of reductive dehalogenases, in addition to genes for utilizing a wide range of electron donors and acceptors.

References

Further reading

External links 
LPSN

Type strain of Desulfitobacterium hafniense at BacDive -  the Bacterial Diversity Metadatabase

Peptococcaceae
Bacteria described in 1996